Didesmus is a genus of flowering plants belonging to the family Brassicaceae.

Its native range is Mediterranean region.

Species:

Didesmus aegyptius 
Didesmus bipinnatus

References

Brassicaceae
Brassicaceae genera